A Toucan is a brightly marked tropical bird with a colorful bill.

Toucan may also refer to:

 Aero Adventure Toucan, an American home built aircraft design
 Canaero Toucan ultralight aircraft
 Toucan crossing, a road crossing for pedestrians and cyclists in the UK

See also
 Tucana, a constellation in the southern sky
 EMBRAER Tucano, a Brazilian military trainer aircraft
 Short Tucano, a British military trainer aircraft
 Tucan, member of Superorganism (band)